Jean-Charles Richard Berger (8 December 1924 – 11 February 2001) was a Canadian politician, television commentator, radio commentator and reporter. He was elected to the House of Commons of Canada in the 1963 election to represent the riding of Montmagny—L'Islet. He was re-elected in 1965 and defeated in 1968 in the riding of Kamouraska. He died in 2001 at the age of 76.

References

1924 births
Liberal Party of Canada MPs
Members of the House of Commons of Canada from Quebec
2001 deaths